Georg Christian Dieffenbach (4 December 1822 Schlitz, Hesse - 10 May 1901 Schlitz) was a German poet and theologian.

Biography
Dieffenbach  was educated at Giessen and was made chief pastor in Schlitz in 1871. His poems for children are still very popular in Germany. He also wrote many liturgical, devotional, homiletic and poetical works, which attained a great degree of popularity.

Notes

References

1822 births
1901 deaths
People from Vogelsbergkreis
19th-century German poets
German Protestant clergy
German male poets
19th-century German male writers
19th-century German writers